Odessi is Mick Parks, Mick Wilson of Tilt and Andy Moor, Martin Smith (Leama).  They are well known for their singles "Moments of Space", "Beautiful Malika", and "Over Again".  The first two were released on Baroque Records and the third on Primal Records.  Their music has appeared in the Renaissance series and Global Underground series.

External links

British electronic music groups
British trance music groups
Electronic dance music record labels
Global Underground